Marqesheh (also Romanized as Mārqesheh) is a village in Churs Rural District, in the Central District of Chaypareh County, West Azerbaijan Province, Iran. At the 2006 census, its population was 260, in 57 families.

References 

Populated places in Chaypareh County